Viva Piñata may refer to:

Viva Piñata, a  video game series
Viva Piñata (video game), a video game released for Xbox 360 in 2006 and Microsoft Windows in 2007
Viva Piñata: Trouble in Paradise, the sequel to Viva Piñata
Viva Piñata: Pocket Paradise, a Nintendo DS version of the original game
Viva Piñata (TV series), a television series released in conjunction with the original game
Viva Piñata: Party Animals, a party game set in the Viva Piñata universe